Eucalyptus sphaerocarpa, commonly known as the Blackdown stringybark, is a species of tall forest tree that is endemic to Queensland. It has rough, stringy bark on the trunk and branches, lance-shaped to curved adult leaves, flower buds in groups of seven, nine or eleven, white flowers and shortened spherical fruit.

Description
It has rough, grey to brownish, stringy bark on the trunk and branches. Flowering has been recorded in September and the flowers are white.

Taxonomy and naming
Eucalyptus sphaerocarpa was first formally described in 1972 by Lawrie Johnson and Donald Blaxell in Contributions from the New South Wales Herbarium from specimens collected from the Blackdown Tableland. The specific epithet (sphaerocarpa) is derived from ancient Greek words meaning "spherical" and "fruit", referring to the shape of the fruit.

Distribution and habitat
Blackdown stringybark grows in tall, open forest and is restricted to the Blackdown Tableland west of Rockhampton.

Conservation status
This eucalypt is classified as "least concern" under the Queensland Government Nature Conservation Act 1992.

See also
List of Eucalyptus species

External links
Farm Forestry New Zealand, Eucalyptus sphaerocarpa, my favourite durable timber species

References

Trees of Australia
sphaerocarpa
Myrtales of Australia
Flora of Queensland
Plants described in 1972